Alishba Yousuf is a Pakistani VJ, model and actress who works in Pakistani television series and telefilms. She has appeared in supporting roles in several television series, including Main Abdul Qadir Hoon (2010), Takkay ki Ayegi Baraat (2011), Meray Dard Ko Jo Zuban Miley (2012), Annie ki Ayegi Baraat (2012), Sargoshi (2016) and Tanhaiyan Naye Silsilay (2012).

Personal life 
Alishba was born on September 16, 1985, and was brought up in a Muslim family in Karachi, Pakistan. She is the sister of VJ Palwasha Yousuf and actress Syra Yousuf.

On 12 February 2009, she married Rayyan Durrani (who appeared in MasterChef Pakistan) in Karachi. The couple have a daughter, name Iliyana.

Career 
Yousuf started her career as a VJ at TV channel AAG. Since then she has appeared in many TV commercials of leading Pakistani brands like Mobilink, Fair & Lovely, and Peki. Yousuf made her acting debut in serial Chand Pe Dastak on Hum TV. Then she appeared in Main Abdul Qadir Hoon, a drama serial produced by Hum TV, Ek Nazar Meri Taraf on Geo TV, Takkay ki Ayegi Baraat, Meray Charagar, Meray Dard Ko Jo Zuban Miley on Hum TV and Annie ki Ayegi Baraat. She also appeared in ARY Digital reality show Desi Kuriyan with her sister Palwasha. She then appeared in Tanhaiyan Naye Silsilay on ARY Digital with her sister Syra Yousuf.

Television

See also
 List of Pakistani actresses

References

External links
 
 

1985 births
Living people
Pakistani female models
Pakistani television actresses
Actresses from Karachi
21st-century Pakistani actresses